The 2019–20 Qatari League, also known as Qatar Stars League or QNB Stars League for sponsorship reasons, is the 47th edition of top-level football championship in Qatar. Al-Sadd are the defending champions.

The league was halted on 16 March 2020 due to COVID-19 pandemic in Qatar, then later resumed on 24 July 2020.

Teams

Stadia and locations

Personnel and kits

Managerial changes

Foreign players

League table

Results

Positions by round

Relegation play-off

Statistics

Top scorers

Hat-tricks

Top assists

Clean sheets

Team of the Year

References

External links
 

Qatar Stars League seasons
1
Qatar
Qatar Stars League, 2019-20